Uusküla is a village in Jõelähtme Parish, Harju County in northern Estonia.

The northern half of the territory of Uusküla is occupied by the Port of Muuga.

References

 

Villages in Harju County